The Arkansas Army National Guard (ARARNG) is a component of the Arkansas National Guard and the United States National Guard. National coordination of various state National Guard units are maintained through the National Guard Bureau.

Arkansas Army National Guard units are trained and equipped as part of the United States Army. The same ranks and insignia are used and National Guardsmen are eligible to receive all United States military awards. The Arkansas National Guard also bestows a number of state awards for local services rendered in or to the State of Arkansas.

The Arkansas Army National Guard is composed of approximately 6,000 soldiers, and maintains 77 armories in 77 communities. The Arkansas Army National Guard also operates two major training facilities, Chaffee Maneuver Training Center (formerly Fort Chaffee), located near Fort Smith, Arkansas and Robinson Maneuver Training Center (formerly Camp Joseph T. Robinson) located in North Little Rock, Arkansas.

Current units
Arkansas Joint Force Headquarters (AR-JFHQ)
39th Brigade Combat Team (BCT) – formerly 39th Infantry Brigade (Separate) 
1st Battalion, 153rd Infantry Regiment : Malvern, Arkansas
2nd Battalion, 153rd Infantry Regiment: Searcy, Arkansas
1st Battalion, 138th Infantry Regiment: Kansas City, Missouri
1st Squadron, 134th Cavalry Regiment: Lincoln, Nebraska 
1st Battalion, 206th Field Artillery Regiment: Russellville, Arkansas
39th Brigade Support Battalion: Hazen, Arkansas
239th Brigade Engineer Battalion: Conway, Arkansas
142nd Field Artillery Brigade – formerly the 142nd Fires Brigade
Headquarters & Headquarters Battery, 142nd Field Artillery Brigade: Fayetteville, Arkansas
1st Battalion, 142nd Field Artillery Regiment: Bentonville, Arkansas
2nd Battalion, 142nd Field Artillery Regiment: Barling, Arkansas
217th Brigade Support Battalion : Booneville, Arkansas
F Battery, 142nd Field Artillery Regiment : Fayetteville
142nd Signal Company Fayetteville
77th Combat Aviation Brigade: Robinson Maneuver Training Center, North Little Rock, Arkansas 
777th Aviation Support Battalion: Robinson Maneuver Training Center, North Little Rock, Arkansas
1st Battalion, 114th Aviation Regiment: Robinson Maneuver Training Center, North Little Rock, Arkansas
87th Troop Command : Robinson Maneuver Training Center, North Little Rock, Arkansas
871st Troop Command : Hot Springs, Arkansas
875th Engineer Battalion : Jonesboro, Arkansas
233rd Regiment (RTI) : Robinson Maneuver Training Center, North Little Rock, Arkansas
61st WMD CST: Robinson Maneuver Training Center, North Little Rock, Arkansas

Activation policies

National Guard units can be mobilized at any time by presidential order to supplement regular armed forces, and upon declaration of a state of emergency by the governor of the state in which they serve. Unlike Army Reserve members, National Guard members cannot be mobilized individually (except through voluntary transfers and Temporary DutY Assignments TDY), but only as part of their respective units.

Federal

For much of the final decades of the 20th century, National Guard personnel typically served "One weekend a month, two weeks a year", with a portion working for the Guard in a full-time capacity. The current forces formation plans of the US Army call for the typical National Guard unit (or National Guardsman) to serve one year of active duty for every six years of service. More specifically, current Department of Defense policy is that individual Guardsman will be given 24 months between deployments of no more than 12 months each.

State
When not activated for a Federal mission, the governor through the State Adjutant General commands Guard forces. The governor can call the Guard into action during local or statewide emergencies, such as storms, drought, and civil disturbances, to name a few.

History

The Arkansas National Guard traces its roots to the creation of the Territorial Militia in 1804. Interest in the Militia in Arkansas generally waxed and waned throughout the 19th century as various national emergencies arose and passed. Organizations existed at the county and city level, but regimental designations above the company level did not become stable until the closing years of the 19th century. During much of this time local militia companies were supported by private funds. Arkansas provided troops for the War with Mexico, the American Civil War, and the Spanish–American War during the 19th century. In each case, in answer to the governor's call, local militia companies would turn out and be formed into regiments or battalions for induction into federal service. The militia was also heavily engaged in the violence that characterized the Reconstruction period following the Civil War.

Following the Spanish–American War, the Federal Government slowly began to provide increasing funding and direction to the state militias with the organization formally changing its name from the Arkansas State Guard to the Arkansas National Guard following the passage of the National Defense act of 1903. Arkansas National Guard troops participated in the Mexican Expedition in 1916–1917 and returned home briefly before being mobilized again for World War I. When the Arkansas National Guard units were mustered into Federal Service for World War I, their state designations were removed and they were renumbered in accordance with a national System. These new Regimental numbers are still represented today in the Arkansas Army National Guard by the 153rd Infantry Regiment, formerly the 1st Arkansas Infantry, and the 142nd Field Artillery Regiment, formerly the 2nd Arkansas Infantry.

The Arkansas National Guard experience a massive expansion between World War I and World War II, with the first permanent armories being built and troops now directed to drill four times per month and to participate in a two-week encampment in the summers. Arkansas provided many units for World War II. The 142nd Field Artillery, now redesignated as the 936 and 937th Field Artillery Battalions participated in the European Campaigns, while the 206th Coast Artillery and the 153rd Infantry served in the Aleutian Islands.

In 1947, as a result of the creation of the United States Air Force as a separate branch from the United States Army, the Arkansas National Guard was split into the Arkansas Army National Guard and the Arkansas Air National Guard. Both organizations work for the Adjutant General of Arkansas. The Adjutant General may be either a member of the Air National Guard or the Army National Guard.

The 936th and 937th Field Artillery Battalions, along with several other Arkansas Army and Air National Guard units were mobilized again for service in the Korean War. Throughout the Cold War Arkansas National Guard units underwent multiple re-organizations in response to the nation's Cold War strategy. No Arkansas National Guard Troops participated in the Vietnam War, but the state was called upon again to support Operation Desert Shield/Desert Storm.

The years following the first Persian Gulf War saw a dramatic increase in the use of National Guard units for service overseas to support various peace-keeping operations. During the 1980s Arkansas Nation Guard units made multiple training rotations to Honduras during a period of increased Marxist activity. In the 1990s, Arkansas National Guard troops began participating in peace-keeping operations in Bosnia and assisted in the enforcement of a no-fly zone in Iraq by participating in Operation Southern Watch.

Following the terrorist attacks of 11 September 2001, the National Guard transitioned from the nation's strategic reserve to a part of the operational force. In the immediate crisis following the attacks, National Guard troops were deployed to provide security at airports, nuclear plants, and other critical infrastructure in the state and around the nation, as part of Operation Noble Eagle. Arkansas troops participated in operations to support peace-keeping operations in the Sinai and Kosovo to free up regular Army troops for combat, but the state has also contributed multiple troops for the Global War on Terrorism. Every major unit in the Arkansas National Guard has now deployed at least once in support of Operation Iraqi Freedom and the state's 39th Infantry Brigade Combat Team became the first National Guard brigade to deploy to Iraq for a second time when it deployed in 2008.

Throughout its service during times of war, the Arkansas National Guard has continued to perform its role of providing service to the citizens of the state during times of disaster. The Guard has responded to numerous tornadoes, floods and fires, in addition to being called upon to provide security and quell violence in times of civil disturbance. The Guard has also provided support to neighboring states, most notably Louisiana during Hurricanes Katrina, Rita and Ike.

Arkansas National Guard members killed in action

War with Mexico
Colonel Archibald Yell
Corporal Darian Steward
Corporal Pleasant Williams
Corporal Richard Saunders
Corporal Wilson Tomberlin
Captain Andrew Porter
Private Andrew Teague
Private Clairborne Taylor
Private David Hogan
Private Franklin Brown
Private George Martin
Private Green Higgins
Private Harman Winn
Private Harrison Penter
Private Jacob Ray
Private John Milliner
Private John Pelham, Jr.
Private Thomas Rowland
Private William Phipps
Private William Robinson

206th Coast Artillery Regiment
Private Claude H. Biggs, Battery F, Killed in Action, Dutch Harbor, Alaska, 3 June 1942
Private Allen C. Collier, Jr., HQ Battery, 2nd Battalion, Dutch Harbor, Alaska, Killed in Action, 3 June 1942
Private James E. Harrington, Battery E, Killed in Action, Dutch Harbor, Alaska, 3 June 1942
Private Hugh Bryan Timberlake, Battery B, Killed in Action, Dutch Harbor, Alaska, 3 June 1942
Private James R. Wiles, Battery C, Killed in Action, Dutch Harbor, Alaska, 3 June 1942
Private Charles W. Hill, Battery F, Killed in Action, Dutch Harbor, Alaska, 4 June 1942
Private Ambrose D. Regalia, Battery F, Killed in Action, Dutch Harbor, Alaska, 4 June 1942

Killed in action listed on the Battery C, 206th CA monument in Jonesboro, Arkansas
This monument includes the names of several former 206th Coast Artillery members who were Killed in Action with other units after the breakup of the 206th Coast Artillery Regiment in 1944.

Kenneth Burkhart
Clifford Cloud
Joseph J. Eble
John H. Franklin
Charles Hutton
Cletis Jeffers
Fred Johnson
James Lemmer
Owen "H" Lynch
Carl Neal
Ray Shreeve
Frank Sweeney
Roy Wiles (probably the same as Pvt. James R. Wiles listed as KIA from Dutch Harbor)

Korea
Corporal Donald Osbourn
Captain Paul Blew
Private First Class Fred Rose, Jr.
Private First Class Jarrell Graham

Operation Iraqi Freedom 2004
Sergeant First Class William W. Labadie Jr. of Bauxite, Age 45. Killed in Action, 7 April 2004
Captain Arthur L. Felder of Lewisville, Age 36. Killed in Action, 24 April 2004
Chief Warrant Officer Patrick W. Kordsmeier of North Little Rock, Age 49. Killed in Action, 24 April 2004
Staff Sergeant Billy J. Orton of Carlisle, Age 41. Killed in Action, 24 April 2004
Staff Sergeant Stacey C. Brandon of Hazen, Age 35. Killed in Action, 24 April 2004
Specialist Kenneth Melton of Batesville, Age 30. Killed in Action, 25 April 2004
Staff Sergeant Hesley Box of Nashville, Age 24. Killed in Action, 6 May 2004
Sergeant First Class Troy Leon Miranda of Wickes, Age 44. Killed in Action, 20 May 2004
Sergeant Russell L. Collier of Harrison, Age 48. Killed in Action, 3 October 2004
Sergeant Ronald Wayne Baker of Cabot, Age 34. Killed in Action, 13 October 2004
Sergeant Michael A. Smith of Camden, Age 24. Died of Wounds, 26 November 2004

Operation Iraqi Freedom 2005
Specialist Jimmy D. Buie of Floral, Age 44. Killed in Action, 4 January 2005
Specialist Joshua S. Marcum of Evening Shade, Age 33. Killed in Action, 4 January 2005
Specialist Jeremy W. McHalffey of Mabelvale, Age 28. Killed in Action, 4 January 2005
Staff Sergeant William T. Robbins of, Beebe, AR, HHC, 39th Infantry Brigade Combat Team, Died at Camp Taji, Iraq, on 10 February 2005, of non-combat related injuries.

Operation Iraqi Freedom 2006

Specialist Derek James Plowman of Everton, AR, Battery C, 1st Battalion, 142nd Fires Brigade.
Died of non-combat related injuries on 20 July 2006 in Baghdad, Iraq.

Operation Iraqi Freedom 2007
Sergeant John R. Massey, 29, of Searcy, Ark., C Battery, 142 Fires Brigade, Ozark Ark.
Sergeant Erich Scott Smallwood, 23, of Truman, Ark., A Company, 875th Engineer Battalion, KIA 26 MAY 2007, Balad, Iraq.

Operation Iraqi Freedom 2008
Sergeant First Class Anthony Lynn Woodham, Age 37, of Rogers, Ark., Heber Springs, Ark., died 5 July, at Camp Adder, Tallil, Iraq, from non-combat related injuries.
Specialist James M. Clay, Age 25, of Mountain Home, Ark.; Little Rock, Ark.; died 13 November 2008 in Anbar province, Iraq, of injuries sustained in a vehicle accident.

See also
 Arkansas State Guard
 List of armored and cavalry regiments of the United States Army

References

External links
Arkansas National Guard
Arkansas Army National Guard at GlobalSecurity
Bibliography of Arkansas Army National Guard History compiled by the United States Army Center of Military History
GlobalSecurity.org Army National Guard page
Off to War: From Rural Arkansas to Iraq – 10 Part 2004 Discovery Times TV series embedded in a unit of the Arkansas National Guard 39th Brigade and their families, throughout their year-long deployment in Iraq – produced / directed by Brent and Craig Renaud

Army National Guard
 Army National Guard
Army National Guard
Military units and formations established in 1804
Army National Guard
Organizations based in North Little Rock, Arkansas
Army National Guard
United States Army National Guard by state